Tsutskiridze is a Georgian family name from the central-western Imereti region of Georgia.

Notable members
Giorgi Tsutskiridze (born 1996), Georgian rugby union player
Levan Tsutskiridze (born 1926), Georgian monumentalist artist, illustrator and painter

Georgian-language surnames
Surnames of Georgian origin